Saturday Night Live Arabic, commonly known as SNL Arabia, is an Egyptian late-night sketch comedy and variety television program broadcast on OSN Ya Hala HD. It is the Arab world's edition of the long-running American TV show Saturday Night Live on NBC. Each episode is hosted by a celebrity guest, who usually delivers an opening monologue and performs in sketches with the cast as with featured performances by a musical guest. An episode normally begins with a cold open sketch that ends with someone breaking character and proclaiming, "from Cairo, it's Saturday Night Live in Arabic", properly beginning the show.

The weekly program premiered on February 16, 2016, on OSN and aired on 11:30 pm EET. On October 7, 2017, at the beginning of season 4 the show started airing on ONtv. The show was suspended by the Supreme Media Council in February 2018 for containing "sexual implications".

Cast 
 Khalid Mansour (Weekend Update anchor)
 Shadi Alfons (Weekend Update anchor)
 Nour Qadrooo
 Tony Maher
 Mahmoud Ellisy
 Islam Ibrahim
 Mirna Gamil
 Ahmed Sultan
 Allawi al-Husseini
 Nancy Salah
 Yara Fahmi
 Hazim Ehab
 Amro Wahba (Joined 2017)

Cast timeline

Series overview

Episodes

Season 1 (2016)

Season 2 (2016)

Season 3 (2017)

Season 4 (2017–18)

Specials

References

External links 
 

Saturday Night Live
2016 Egyptian television series debuts
2010s Egyptian television series
Egyptian comedy television series
Egyptian satirical television shows
Non-American television series based on American television series
Arabic-language television shows
Live television series
Egyptian political satire
Political satirical television series